Nebria composita macra is a subspecies of ground beetle in the Nebriinae subfamily that is endemic to Tibet.

References

composita macra
Beetles described in 2005
Beetles of Asia
Endemic fauna of Tibet